A Surah is a chapter of the Qur'an.

Sura may also refer to:

People
 Bob Sura (born 1973), American former basketball player
 Lucius Licinius Sura (40–108/113), Roman senator and close associate of Emperor Trajan
 Publius Cornelius Lentulus Sura (died 63 BC), stepfather of Mark Anthony and participant in the Second Catilinarian conspiracy
 Aemilius Sura, Roman historian (1st century BC or AD)
 Sura Saenkham (born 1959), Thai boxer, called Khaosai Galaxy
 Sura, the wife of Spartacus in the television series Spartacus: Blood and Sand

Places
 Sura (city), a city in ancient Babylonia
 Sura Academy, a Jewish Yeshiva Academy in this city
 Sura (Lycia), a town in ancient Lycia, now in Turkey
 Sura, Syria, a city in Syria and a former Bishopric (currently a titular see)
 Sura (river), 5 rivers in Russia
 Sura, a village in Slivilești Commune, Gorj County, Romania
 Șura Mare, a commune in Sibiu County, Romania
 Șura Mică, a commune in Sibiu County, Romania

Food and drink
Sura (alcoholic drink), an alcoholic drink used as an anaesthetic in ancient India
Sura, honorific form of bap, food for the monarch in the Korean cuisine

Other
 Rajarsitulyakula, also called Sura dynasty, a dynasty in India
 Sura (film), a 2010 Indian Tamil film starring Vijay
 Sura (moth), a genus of moth
 SNORA and SURA-D rockets, an unguided Swiss air-to-surface rocket
 Sura Ionospheric Heating Facility, a research facility in Russia
 Calf (leg), the back portion of the lower leg in human anatomy
 Deva (Hinduism), or Sura, a minor, benevolent deity in Hinduism
 Sura, the first month in the Javanese calendar
 SURA, the Southeastern Universities Research Association
 Shan United Revolutionary Army

See also
 
 

 Sara (disambiguation)
 Sera (disambiguation)
 Sira (disambiguation)
 Sora (disambiguation)
 Syra